Spain took part in the Eurovision Song Contest 1963. The country was represented by José Guardiola with the song "Algo prodigioso".

Before Eurovision

Selection
Conflicting reports state that TVE's aim was to use the Festival de la Canción Mediterránea (Mediterranean Song Festival) as the national final, while others maintain that TVE's intention was to select internally one of the performers that had won a prize in one of the many song festivals that used to take place across the Spanish geography. José Guardiola had won the 1962 Mediterranean Song Festival with the song "Nubes de colores", but the result was declared null and void the day after the festival because a fix was discovered in the voting process. Paper ballots were sold to the audience in the hall; however, by the end of the festival, more ballots were counted in the box than the number that had been sold. José Guardiola was chosen to represent Spain but with another song, "Algo prodigioso".

At Eurovision
At the final on 23 March 1963, José Guardiola was the 12th to perform in the running order, following France and preceding Sweden. He received two points from Yugoslavia for his performance, placing 12th in a field of 16.

Voting

References

1963
Countries in the Eurovision Song Contest 1963
Eurovision